Gesualdo may refer to:
Gesualdo, Campania, a town in Italy

Given name
Gesualdo Bufalino (1920–1996), Italian writer
Gesualdo Francesco Ferri (1728–1788), Italian painter
Gesualdo Lanza (1779–1859), Italian teacher of music who made his career in London
Gesualdo Piacenti (born 1954), Italian professional football player

Surname
Alfonso Gesualdo (1540–1603), Italian Cardinal
Ascanio Gesualdo (died 1638), Italian archbishop 
Carlo Gesualdo (1566–1613), Italian late Renaissance composer 
Gesualdo: Death for Five Voices, a film about the composer
Gesualdo, opera by Alfred Schnittke
Gesualdo, opera by Bo Holten
Eddy Gesualdo (born 1968), Canadian professional football player
Scipione Gesualdo (died 1608), Italian archbishop